The 1970 Arizona State Sun Devils football team was an American football team that represented Arizona State University in the Western Athletic Conference (WAC) during the 1970 NCAA University Division football season. In their 13th season under head coach Frank Kush, the Sun Devils compiled an 11–0 record (7–0 against WAC opponents), won the WAC championship, and outscored their opponents by a combined total of 405 to 151. ASU was picked as the overall #1 team for the 1970 College Football season by Poling System. Poling was a mathematic system used to rank college football teams. It was considered a "National Champion Major Selector" by the National Collegiate Athletic Association.

The team's statistical leaders included Joe Spagnola with 1,991 passing yards, Bobby Thomas with 900 rushing yards, and J. D. Hill with 908 receiving yards.

Schedule

Reference:

Game summaries

Arizona

Roster

1970 team players in the NFL
The following players were claimed in the 1971 NFL Draft.

Reference:

References

Arizona State
Arizona State Sun Devils football seasons
Western Athletic Conference football champion seasons
Peach Bowl champion seasons
College football undefeated seasons
Arizona State Sun Devils football